Ischiopsopha plana is a species of beetles from the family Scarabaeidae, subfamily Cetoniinae, tribe Schizorhinini.

Description
The head, the thorax and the elytra of this beetle are metallic green. The tip of the scutellum is visible.

Distribution
This species can be found in Indonesia (Solomon Islands, Maluku Islands, Ceram Island, Ambon Island).

References

Cetoniinae
Beetles described in 1817